Gefangen im Schattenreich von Die Ärzte ("Imprisoned in the netherworld of Die Ärzte") is the third VHS by German rock band Die Ärzte. It features live and backstage videos. It is the first part of the tour videos from 1993 to 1996.

Track listing 
 "Super Drei" (Super three)
 "Geh mit mir" (Date me lit. Go with me)
 "FaFaFa"
 "Friedenspanzer" (Peace tank)
 "Der Misanthrop" (The misanthrope)
 "Teddybär" (Teddy bear)
 "2000 Mädchen" (2,000 girls)
 "Vermissen, Baby" (Missing, baby)
 "Omaboy" (Grandma boy)
 "Schunder-Song"
 "Ich bin reich" (I'm rich)
 "Anneliese Schmidt"
 "Westerland"
 "Revolution"
 "Ist das alles?" (Is that all?)
 Video clip: "Hurra" (Hooray!)
 "Making of: Quark"

Noch mehr gefangen im Schattenreich von Die Ärzte 
Noch mehr gefangen im Schattenreich von Die Ärzte ("Even more imprisoned in the netherworld of Die Ärzte") is the fourth VHS by the German rock band Die Ärzte. It features the second part of the tour videos from 1993 to 1996.

Track listing 
 "Making of: Planet Punk"
 "Zum Bäcker" (To the baker)
 "Mysteryland"
 "Making of: 3-Tage-Bart" (Designer stubble; lit: 3-days-beard)
 "Trick 17 m.S"
 "Elke"
 "Die Banane" (The banana)
 "Frank'n'Stein"
 "Westerland"
 "Paul"
 "BGS" (Bundesgrenzschutz - Federal Border Guard)
 "Making of: Hurra" (Hooray!)
 "Die traurige Ballade von Susi Spakowski"
 "Die Allerschürfste" (The Superhottest)
 "Tour-Charts - Was Die Ärzte so hinter der Bühne singen…" (Tour charts - What Die Ärzte sing backstage)
 "Alleine in der Nacht" (Alone at night)
 "Sweet Sweet Gwendoline"
 "Making of: Schunder-Song"
 "Schopenhauer"
 "Punk Rock - Die Ärzte als Gesangstrio, das alte deutsche Lieder vorträgt" (Punk Rock - Die Ärzte as a singing-trio, singing old German songs)
 "B.S.L." (Brutaler, schneller Lärm - Brutal, rapid noise)
 "Wie am ersten Tag" (Like the first day)
 "Blumen" (Flowers)
 "Erna P."
 "Vollmilch" (Whole milk)
 "Schrei nach Liebe" (Cry for love)
 "Rod Loves You"

Vollkommen gefangen im Schattenreich von Die Ärzte 
Vollkommen gefangen im Schattenreich von Die Ärzte ("Completely imprisoned in the netherworld of Die Ärzte") is the third DVD by German rock band Die Ärzte. It is a DVD sampler of the tour videos from 1993 to 1996.

Song information 
VHS 1
 Track 6, 12 from the EP Zu schön, um wahr zu sein!
 Track 11 from the album Die Ärzte
 Track 7 from the album Ist das alles? (13 Höhepunkte mit den Ärzten)
 Track 13 from the album Das ist nicht die ganze Wahrheit...
 Track 3, 4, 9, 14 from the album Die Bestie in Menschengestalt
 Track 1, 2, 5, 8, 10 from the album Planet Punk

VHS 2
 Track 24 from the single "Paul"
 Track 8, 10 from the album Debil
 Track 3, 16, 17 from the album Die Ärzte
 Track 6, 9, 22, 23 from the album Das ist nicht die ganze Wahrheit...
 Track 2, 25 from the album Die Ärzte früher!
 Track 11 from the EP 1, 2, 3, 4 – Bullenstaat!
 Track 14, 19, 26 from the album Die Bestie in Menschengestalt
 Track 5, 7, 13, 21, 27 from the album Planet Punk

Chart performance
Vollkommen gefangen im Schattenreich von Die Ärzte peaked at No. 71 in Germany.

Certifications

References

Die Ärzte video albums
1996 video albums
Live video albums
1996 live albums